Laurance "Laurie" Thomas David Daniel (born 5 March 1942) is a former  international rugby union player. 

Daniel made his debut for Wales on 7 February 1970 versus Scotland. He played club rugby for Newport RFC and Pontypool RFC.

References 

1942 births
Blaenavon RFC players
Ebbw Vale RFC players
Living people
Newport RFC players
Pontypool RFC players
Wales international rugby union players
Welsh rugby union players